Iran Human Rights (IHR) (Persian: سازمان حقوق بشر ایران) is a non-profit international non-governmental organization focused on human rights in Iran. Founded in 2005, it is a non-partisan and politically independent organisation based in Oslo, Norway. The human rights defender and neuroscientist Mahmood Amiry-Moghaddam is the co-founder and international spokesperson of the organisation .

Iran Human Rights' work is focused on the abolition of the death penalty, supporting human rights defenders, empowering civil society and promoting all human rights for all citizens. As well as reporting on breaches of human rights, IHR also publishes a bi-weekly Persian-language legal magazine called "Hoghooghe Ma", translated to "Our Rights", and airs a television program called "Edam Bas Ast", translated to "Enough Executions."

Abolition of the Death Penalty
Iran Human Rights is one of the NGOs working towards the abolition of the death penalty in Iran. Iran Human Rights has been publishing its annual reports on the death penalty in Iran since 2008. Because of its broad network inside Iran, Iran Human Rights receives reports regarding the death penalty cases which have been carried out secretly or have not been announced by the official media in Iran. Besides reporting on and monitoring the death penalty trends, Iran Human Rights works with the international media to create awareness about the situation of the death penalty in Iran.

Iran Human Rights is an elected member of the Steering Committee of the World Coalition Against the Death Penalty.

Cases
Navid Afkari: In the case of 27 year-old wrestler and protester, Navid Afkari, IHR published the court documents and the breaches against Navid and his brothers at every stage of their detention and legal proceedings. Their lawyer of choice resigned after being threatened by judicial authorities and replaced by appointed lawyers. In recordings of his trial published by IHR, Navid can be heard defending himself and demanding to see the CCTV footage used as evidence against him. The brothers said they had been tortured and coerced through threats against their family to force them into confessing to what they called lies. IHR refuted the judiciary’s claims after the court documents and evidence were released again on 1 September 2020.

Human rights defenders
IHR publishes an annual report on the situation of human rights defenders in Iran. In its 2019/2020 report, IHR highlighted the situation of 53 human rights defenders who had altogether been sentenced to nearly 400 years of imprisonment and 787 lashes. In an article marking International Human Rights Day, Mahmood Amiry-Moghaddam wrote about the situation of human rights defenders in Iran and said: "Ignoring human rights issues is no longer a viable solution. It is time to call on democratic nations to prioritize a human rights-based foreign policy. Not only because of the values and principles that are the basis of our rights system but because sustainable peace and stability cannot be achieved without human rights."

Protest monitoring

Aban Tribunal
On the anniversary of the 2019-2020 Iranian protests, IHR joined Justice for Iran and ECPM to establish an International People's Tribunal (the Aban Tribunal, in reference to the Iranian month of Aban when the repression took place in Iran at the end of 2019) to investigate the atrocities that were committed during and in the aftermath of the November 2019 nationwide protests on behalf of the victim's families. On its establishment, IHR Director Mahmood Amiry-Moghaddam said: "The establishment of this Tribunal is urgent and necessary. When the international community turns a blind eye to such atrocities, those who know what happened have a moral responsibility to bring about justice and accountability."

Mahsa Amini protests

In 2022, protests erupted after public outrage over the death of 22-year-old Mahsa Amini in police custody. She was arrested by Islamic religious police, Iran's political and morality police, for violating the Islamic Republic's strict dress code. Iran Human Rights has continuously monitored and reported government atrocities during the Mahsa Amini protests. As of 5 November 2022, IHR has documented 304 people killed (including 41 children) in the protests.

Magazine
Iran Human Rights publishes a bi-weekly Persian-language legal magazine called "Hoghooghe Ma", translated to "Our Rights". Each edition highlights a particular issue.

Television program
IHR broadcasts a Persian language television program titled Edam Bas Ast, translated to "Enough Executions."

See also
Killing of Nika Shakarami
Death of Hadis Najafi
Mahmood Amiry-Moghaddam
Human rights in Iran

References

2005 establishments in Norway
International human rights organizations
International organisations based in Norway
Organisations based in Iran
Human rights organisations based in Iran
Mahsa Amini protests
Non-profit organisations based in Norway
Organisations based in Oslo